Satyen Bose (22 January 1916 – 9 June 1993) was a film director from India. He has directed both Bengali and Hindi language films. Among his most notable films are Raat Aur Din, Chalti Ka Naam Gaadi, Dosti, and Jagriti. Jagriti won the Filmfare Best Movie Award in 1956 and Dosti won the same award in 1964.

Without any formal training in cinema, Bose rose to fame with his offbeat debut film Parivartan (1949). He remade the Bengali film in Hindi as Jagriti in 1954.

Filmography

References

External links 
 

Bengali film directors
Hindi-language film directors
Film directors from Kolkata
1916 births
1993 deaths
Malayalam film directors
20th-century Indian film directors
Screenwriters from Kolkata
Hindi screenwriters
20th-century Indian dramatists and playwrights
20th-century Indian screenwriters